Kabiru Akinsola Olarewaju (born 21 January 1991 in Imo State), known as Akinsola, is a Nigerian footballer who plays as a forward.

Club career
On 6 January 2009, Étoile Sportive du Sahel announced the signing of 18-year-old Akinsola, who agree to a five-year deal at Stade Olympique de Sousse. However, his official debut was delayed due to the fact he was appearing at the African Youth Championship in Kigali.

Akinsola apparently had plenty of suitors vying for his signature, but decided to link up with the Tunisians, joining countryman Emeka Opara. On 31 January, however, he changed clubs again, signing a 3+2 contract with Spain's UD Salamanca and appearing rarely over the course of two second division seasons, his first competitive appearance only taking place on 9 May due to bureaucratic problems; additionally, he spent several weeks on the sidelines with a thigh injury.

In the summer of 2010, Akinsola stayed in Spain but dropped down to the third level, moving to Zamora CF. He continued competing in that tier in the following years with Cádiz CF, FC Cartagena and CE L'Hospitalet, this being interspersed by a brief spell in Cyprus.

International career
Akinsola came into prominence in 2007, when he appeared for the Nigeria under-17 team in the African Youth Championship in Togo and scored the winning goal in the final match. He represented his country at the 2007 FIFA U-17 World Cup in the Korea Republic, winning the competition with the Golden Eaglet.

Honours
FIFA U-17 World Cup: 2007

References

External links

1991 births
Living people
Nigerian footballers
Yoruba sportspeople
Association football forwards
Nigeria Professional Football League players
Sunshine Stars F.C. players
Étoile Sportive du Sahel players
Segunda División players
Segunda División B players
UD Salamanca players
Zamora CF footballers
Granada CF footballers
Cádiz CF players
FC Cartagena footballers
CE L'Hospitalet players
Mérida AD players
Cypriot First Division players
Doxa Katokopias FC players
Liga I players
FC Politehnica Iași (2010) players
Nigerian expatriate footballers
Expatriate footballers in Tunisia
Expatriate footballers in Spain
Expatriate footballers in Cyprus
Expatriate footballers in Romania
Nigerian expatriate sportspeople in Tunisia
Nigerian expatriate sportspeople in Spain
Nigerian expatriate sportspeople in Cyprus
Nigerian expatriate sportspeople in Romania
Sportspeople from Imo State